Aston Villa played the  1938–39 English football season in the Football League First Division having won promotion in the previous season. The pre-season Jubilee Fund matches saw Villa pitched against local rivals West Bromwich Albion. The derby match ended in a 1–1 draw with Frank Broome scoring for Aston Villa and Harry Jones grabbing one for the Baggies.

On 19 September, Villa secured their first home win with a 5–0 win over Brentford which The Times described as impressive as it was decisive.

League table

References

External links
AVFC History: 1938-39

Aston Villa F.C. seasons
Aston Villa F.C. season